The 1978–79 South-West Indian Ocean cyclone season was an average cyclone season. The season officially ran from November 1, 1978, to April 30, 1979.

Systems

Tropical Cyclone Angele

Angele form on December 13, while stationed in the middle of the Mozambique Channel. It traveled north and gradually organized into a tropical storm while performing a tight counter-clockwise loop. On December 18 Angele intensified into a tropical cyclone before making landfall on Mozambique. Angele weakened to a tropical storm while over land, but re-intensified back to a tropical cyclone as it re-emerged into the Mozambique channel. The cyclone moved south and quite abruptly, on December 23, moved to the northeast. On December 24 Angele reached a peak intensity as a category three cyclone. The system weakened slightly before making landfall on Madagascar two days later. The weak storm moved over the open Indian Ocean and translated into an extra-tropical storm.

Angele is responsible for four deaths and 2,500 people homeless in Mozambique. In Madagascar 70 people were killed by the storm's passage.

Cyclone 03S

03S entered the basin on December 24 and lasted until December 26.

Tropical Cyclone Benjamine

Benjamine existed from January 3 to January 14. On January 7, the cyclone passed between Réunion and Mauritius. On the former island, the storm dropped heavy rainfall, reaching  at Gite de Bellecombe, along with  wind gusts at St. Denis. The storm damaged or destroyed 194 houses, while also damaging crops and power lines.

Intense Tropical Cyclone Celine

Celine existed from January 31 to February 12. Celine looped near Mauritius while intensifying, and later passed just north of Rodrigues. Wind gusts on the latter island reached . The storm killed about half of the population of the critically endangered Rodrigues flying fox.

Tropical Depression Dora

Dora existed from February 4 to February 12.

Moderate Tropical Storm Estelle

Estelle existed from February 10 to February 18. For several days, Estelle moved around the Mascarene Islands, with a peak rainfall total on Réunion of  recorded at Petite Plaine.

Tropical Depression Fatou

Fatou existed from February 14 to February 16.

Tropical Depression Gelie

Gelie existed from March 8 to March 14.

Tropical Depression Helios

Helios existed from March 26 to March 28.

Intense Tropical Cyclone Idylle

Idylle developed on April 4 and left the basin on April 13.

See also
Atlantic hurricane seasons: 1978, 1979
Eastern Pacific hurricane seasons: 1978, 1979
Western Pacific typhoon seasons: 1978, 1979
North Indian Ocean cyclone seasons: 1978, 1979

References

South-West Indian Ocean cyclone seasons
1978–79 Southern Hemisphere tropical cyclone season